Margaret Elizabeth Cooper (née Douglas; 25 January  1918 – 18 July 2016) was a member of the Women's Royal Naval Service during the Second World War who worked at the signal interception and deciphering centre at Bletchley Park, England.

Early life and education
Cooper was born Margaret Elizabeth Douglas in Punta del Este, Uruguay, on 25 January 1918. Her father, Jack Douglas, originally from Canada, owned a beach house across the River Plate from Argentina, where he owned a beef ranch. Her mother Vera was Anglo-Argentinian, and she had three siblings, Katherine, Evelyn and Sholto Douglas. She was educated at St Mary's School, Wantage, in England.

Career
Cooper joined the Women's Royal Naval Service ("Wrens") in September 1941. She was trained at Westfield College, London, and expected to become a cook but part way through her training a request was received, said to be from Winston Churchill himself, for volunteers to do unspecified secret work. Cooper and most of her class accepted and quickly found themselves at the signals interception and decoding base of Bletchley Park in central England and not the naval base they had expected.

At first she worked in Hut 11 on the bombes that decoded intercepted messages but in late 1942 she was moved to Stanmore where backup bombes were being set up as a precaution against the destruction of the originals by enemy bombing.  She then became assistant to Frank Birch, head of the naval section in Hut 4, which was known as the "U-boat room".  Cooper would also regularly liaise with the Admiralty's Operational Intelligence Centre in London. She was promoted to petty officer, and then commissioned as a third officer, after which in April 1944 she was sent to Plymouth to work at the underground base there at Mount Wise, liaising between Bletchley and Plymouth on the movements of U-boats. She never talked about her secret work until after the nature of the code-breaking operation was revealed by F.W. Winterbotham in The Ultra Secret (1974).

Personal life
In 1945, she married Craig Cooper, a Royal Canadian Air Force officer, whom she had met three years earlier. Their initial meeting was a brief conversation on a platform at Bletchley railway station, but they did not even exchange names. Later in 1942, she received a letter addressed to "the blonde Wren from Argentina on the platform at Bletchley station".

They married in England, and he returned to his teaching career in Canada. They had four children, Elizabeth Salton, Ian Cooper, Jane Toews and Peter Cooper.

Cooper died on 18 July 2016 at St. Peter's Hospice in Hamilton, aged 98.

References

1918 births
2016 deaths
People from Punta del Este
Bletchley Park women
People educated at Heathfield School, Ascot
People educated at St Mary’s School, Wantage
Women's Royal Naval Service officers
Canadian people of Argentine descent
Women's Royal Naval Service ratings
Uruguayan people of Canadian descent
Uruguayan emigrants to Canada
Royal Navy officers of World War II
Women's Royal Naval Service personnel of World War II